Bradina trigonalis is a moth in the family Crambidae. It was described by Hiroshi Yamanaka in 1984. It is found in Japan.

References

Moths described in 1984
Bradina